KOWW-LP (98.1 FM, "The Cowlip") is a low-power radio station licensed to Burlington, North Dakota and serves Burlington and Minot, North Dakota. It broadcasts a freeform eclectic music format and its broadcast license is held by Pointe of View Institute. Its programming is provided by local volunteers.

History 
This station received its original construction permit from the Federal Communications Commission on August 7, 2003. The new station was assigned the KOWW-LP call sign by the FCC on August 20, 2003. KOWW-LP received its license to cover from the FCC on June 15, 2005.

References

External links 
 

OWW-LP
OWW-LP
OWW-LP
Community radio stations in the United States
Radio stations established in 2005
2005 establishments in North Dakota
Ward County, North Dakota